Bengaluru Suburban Railway (also Bengaluru Commuter Railway)  is an under construction suburban rail network for the city of Bengaluru. A Suburban Rail system for the city was first proposed in 1983. Since then, several different route proposals were made but no Suburban Rail project took shape. It was finally approved in the 2019 Railway Budget. On 1 February 2020, finance minister, Nirmala Sitharaman mentioned in her budget that the project would be implemented at cost of Rs 18,600 crores. The central government would provide 20% of the equity and facilitate external assistance up to 60 percent of the project cost. It will be first of its kind and unique in India as it will have metro like facilities and rolling stock. It has slowest design speed among all the new suburban rail projects currently being implemented in India as Nagpur broad-gauge Metro and National Capital Region Transport Corporation are building rail tracks for design speed of 200 km/h with operating speed of 160 km/h.

Suburban rail along with Hyperloop, High speed Airport Train, Intercity trains, Metro rail, Metro Neo, Metrolite will provide rail based public transport to the Bengaluru' s general public.

History
A Suburban rail service existed in Bengaluru as early as in 1963 for HAL employees to commute from KSR Bengaluru to Vimanapura Railway station. In 1983 a formal Suburban Rail system for Bengaluru had first been proposed by a team from Southern Railway under then Railway Minister C. K. Jaffer Sharief and Member of Parliament representing Bengaluru. Their recommendation had been to invest in 3 suburban rail lines and a 58-km ring railway. The package was estimated to cost Rs. 6,500 million in 1983 terms (US$628.6 million) spread over a 25-year period.

Again in 1993 C. K. Jaffer Sharief Minister of Railway’s, India. Influenced the State of Karnataka to established another committee look into mass rapid transit. This committee recommended essentially the same put forward by Southern Railway in 1983 and the same circular railway. Both in 1983 and 1993 the proposal was rejected by then Prime Minister of India.

In 2007, RITES (Rail Indian Technical and Economic Services) was commissioned by the Government of Karnataka to conduct a CTTP (Comprehensive Traffic & Transportation Plan) for the city of Bengaluru. Their report called for 10 Suburban Rail routes totaling 204.0 km. As per the report, Suburban Rail (along existing rail routes) would cost much lesser than mass rapid transit systems.

In July 2010, a proposal was made by Praja Bengaluru in a 'Call To Action' report. This plan was supported & presented at the center for infrastructure, Sustainable Transportation and Urban Planning (CisTup), Indian Institute of Science (IISc), Bengaluru. The proposal had suggested a 376 km network around three hubs (Yesvantpur Junction, Benniganahalli & Yelahanka Junction) with 42 new stations. A key recommendation was to use the congested KSR Bengaluru only as a pass-through station.

In November 2011, RITES conducted a feasibility study exclusively for suburban rail services in Bengaluru and submitted their final report to the Directorate of Urban Land Transport (DULT) in November 2012. The 179-page report studied all existing routes totalling 440.8 km of the rail network in & around the city & development of Suburban Rail services over three phases.

The state government approved the suburban rail system on 5 July 2013. Chief Minister Siddaramaiah approved the system in the 2013-14 state budget that he presented on 9 July 2013. The budget proposed the setting up of the Bengaluru Suburban Rail Corporation Limited, a special purpose vehicle (SPV) to implement the project estimated to cost .

In the 2016-17 Railway budget, Union Railway Minister Suresh Prabhu announced a partnership with Karnataka government for a Rs. 9000-crore Suburban Rail network for Bengaluru, but did not allocate any funds. On 3 February 2016, the state government proposed a modified version of the original RITES plan. This looked to kick-start the project with a Rs. 1,000-crore investment to connect Mandya with Kengeri, Whitefield with Baiyappanahalli and Tumakuru with Yeshwanthpura Junction. The state government released 100 crore towards this. The state appointed RITES again to study the feasibility of the project, and the latter's survey deemed the project as feasible. However, Railways stated that the proposed Phase Two of the project (linking Tumakuru and Yeshwanthpura Junction) was not feasible.

In November 2018, RITES prepared a revised plan for a 161 km network that was again amended in August 2019 to reduce costs. Out of 82 stations, 29 stations were deleted, route length reduced to 148 km & costs lowered to Rs. 16,000 crores. This was finally accepted by Government of India.

Route proposals

A) Routes recommended by RITES for CTTP - 2007

B) Routes proposed by Praja in July, 2010

C) Routes studied by RITES, as per their final report of November, 2012

D) Routes proposed by RITES & approved

*The total number of stations is 58 (figures under individual routes include interchange stations).

Current Status
Though approved in principle by Government of India, budget allocations have been paltry over the last few years as only token amounts have been allocated. On 7 October 2020, the project was approved by Prime Minister's Office and the Cabinet Committee on Economic Affairs (headed by the Prime Minister). The State Government commenced providing budgetary support for the Suburban Rail project & 500 crores was allocated in the 2020-21 budget. Meanwhile, K-RIDE has kick-started the Suburban project by calling tenders for Land Survey, hiring staff etc.

Two priority lines will be taken up first as per Government of Karnataka's advise. These are Mallige Line and Kanaka Line. The Suburban rail routes are named after local flowers.

As of 2022, Prime Minister Narendra Modi will lay the foundation stone for the start of construction of the project on 20 June.

Routes 

Route-1: Sampige Line

Route-2: Mallige Line

Route-3: Parijaata Line

Route-4: Kanaka Line

Depots 

Two depots have been planned. Jnanabharathi depot would be spread over 56.9 acres and Devanahalli depot would be on 61.2 acres. However, these are not on the priority routes 2 and 4. Hence, feasibility for a depot at Huskuru along Kanaka Line is being explored besides other options.

Features
DPR for the project has included many rare and unique features in System.
 Many Stations will act as Integrated commercial hubs.
 Many Stations will be built as Intermodal Integration hubs were people can switch easily with other modes of transport like Metro.
 Stations will have Automated fare collection system and Platform screen doors.
 DPR suggests that Metro Train sets (EMU) – RS 13 series, which is used in Delhi Metro and manufactured at M/s BEML, Bengaluru, is the most suitable for Bengaluru Commuter Rail.ystem.

Current MEMU and DEMU operation by Indian Railways
 Indian Railway's South Western Railway zone operates several MEMU and DEMU train services from Bengaluru to Hosur, Dharmapuri, Jolarpettai, Tumakuru, Marikuppam near Kolar Gold Fields, Bangarapete, Hindupur, Mysuru, Kolar, Kuppam and Hassan.
 Hosur, Dharmapuri and Jolarpettai is across the state border in Tamil Nadu. Hindupur and Kuppam is across state border in Andhra Pradesh, while Tumakuru, Bangarapete, Mysuru, Marikuppam, Kolar and Hassan are in Karnataka.
 Service to and from Hassan, Hindupur, Hosur, Dharmapuri and Tumakuru are operated from Yesvantpur Junction, while services to Mysuru, Kolar, Marikuppam, Kuppam, Bangarapete and Jolarpettai are from KSR Bengaluru and Bengaluru Contonment.

Integrated intermodal and public transport experience with last mile connectivity

Comprehensive Mobility Plan for Bengaluru provides a roadmap for integrated public transport experience.

Bengaluru Suburban Rail stations will be integrated with other modes of transport for seamless transfer between travel modes - as in European cities. Public Bus Service, Metro trains, Inter-city bus, Inter-city trains, Metrolite, Metro Neo, Hyperloop, BRTS, Peripheral Ring Road, Bus priority corridors, Airport metro, Airport Bus service, High speed Airport Train,  will be integrated with the Suburban train network.

Public Bicycle Sharing (PBS) and the Shared Micro-Mobility System initiatives have been launched to provide last mile connectivity to suburban rail stations.

K-RIDE plans to evolve all 57 stations to integrated commercial hubs (smart station hubs) where people can work, park, shop, eat and trade. Approaches to suburban train stations will be provided from all directions.

Suburban train station plan will not only focus on the development of modern station itself, but also on traffic circulation and road improvement plan, easy switch to other public transport, widening of approach roads, ramp based multi-level access as in the New Delhi Railway station re-development model.

See also
 Namma Metro
 Hyderabad Multi-Modal Transport System
 Mumbai Suburban Railway

References

External links
 KRide
Govt. exploring rail line to BIAL
 Lobby group for commuter rail in Bengaluru
 Presentation by Divisional Rly Manager
 CRS Bengaluru Ride and Meet

Proposed railway lines in India
Suburban rail in India
Rail transport in Bangalore